Graciele Herrmann (born January 1, 1992) is a Brazilian swimmer who competed at the 2012 and 2016 Olympics.

International career

2011–12
She won two silver medals at the 2011 Pan American Games, in the 50-metre freestyle, and in the 4×100-metre freestyle.

2012 Summer Olympics
At the 2012 Summer Olympics, she finished 22nd in the Women's 50 metre freestyle.

2013–16
At the 2013 World Aquatics Championships in Barcelona, in the 4×100-metre freestyle, she broke the South American record, with a time of 3:41.05, along with Larissa Oliveira, Daynara de Paula and Alessandra Marchioro. The Brazilian team finished in 11th place, and did not advance to the final. She also finished 18th in the 50-metre freestyle.

At the 2014 South American Games in Santiago, Chile, she won two gold medals in the 50-metre and 4×100-metre freestyle (breaking the competition record in both races) and a silver medal in the 100-metre freestyle.

At the 2014 Maria Lenk Trophy, in São Paulo, Herrmann equaled the South American record in the 50-metre freestyle, with a time of 24.76, opening the 4x50m freestyle relay of her club.

At the 2014 Pan Pacific Swimming Championships in Gold Coast, Queensland, she finished 5th in the 50-metre freestyle; 5th in the 4×100-metre freestyle relay, along with Etiene Medeiros, Daynara de Paula and Alessandra Marchioro; 5th in the 4×100-metre medley relay, along with Etiene Medeiros, Ana Carla Carvalho and Daynara de Paula; and 11th in the 100-metre freestyle.

At the 2015 Pan American Games in Toronto, Ontario, Canada, Herrmann won a bronze medal in the 4 × 100 metre freestyle relay, breaking the South American record, with a time of 3:37.39, along with Larissa Oliveira, Etiene Medeiros and Daynara de Paula. She also finished 6th in the 100 metre freestyle, and 7th in the 50 metre freestyle.

At the 2015 World Aquatics Championships in Kazan, she finished 11th in the 4 × 100 metre freestyle relay, 21st in the 50 metre freestyle and 34th in the 100 metre freestyle

2016 Summer Olympics
At the 2016 Summer Olympics, she finished 40th at the Women's 50 metre freestyle.

References 

1992 births
Living people
Brazilian female freestyle swimmers
People from Pelotas
Brazilian people of German descent
Swimmers at the 2011 Pan American Games
Swimmers at the 2015 Pan American Games
Swimmers at the 2012 Summer Olympics
Swimmers at the 2016 Summer Olympics
Olympic swimmers of Brazil
Pan American Games silver medalists for Brazil
Pan American Games bronze medalists for Brazil
Pan American Games medalists in swimming
South American Games gold medalists for Brazil
South American Games silver medalists for Brazil
South American Games medalists in swimming
Competitors at the 2014 South American Games
Medalists at the 2011 Pan American Games
Medalists at the 2015 Pan American Games
Sportspeople from Rio Grande do Sul
20th-century Brazilian women
21st-century Brazilian women